Nessen City is an unincorporated community and census-designated place in Benzie County in the U.S. state of Michigan. The population was 97 at the 2010 census.  Nessen City is located within Colfax Township.

Geography
Nessen City is located along the southern border of Colfax Township in southeastern Benzie County. The southern border of the CDP is along the Manistee County line. The center of the community is at the intersection of Lindy Road and Karlin Road (north)/Nessen Road (south).

History
The community of Nessen City was listed as a newly-organized census-designated place for the 2010 census, meaning it now has officially defined boundaries and population statistics for the first time.

Demographics

References

Traverse City micropolitan area
Census-designated places in Michigan
Unincorporated communities in Benzie County, Michigan
Unincorporated communities in Michigan
Census-designated places in Benzie County, Michigan